Thirty Days or 30 Days may refer to:

Film and TV

Film
 Thirty Days (1916 film), a 1916 film starring Oliver Hardy
 Thirty Days (1922 film), silent film starring Wallace Reid, his last film
 30 Days (1999 film), a comedy featuring Arden Myrin
 30 Days (2004 film), an Indian Hindi film featuring Alok Nath
 30 Days (2006 American film), a 2006 American film edited by Alan Roberts (filmmaker)
 30 Days (2006 film), a Nigerian action thriller film featuring Genevieve Nnaji
 30 Days (upcoming film), a South Korean romantic comedy film

TV
 30 Days (TV series), a reality television program created by Morgan Spurlock
 "Thirty Days" (Star Trek: Voyager), an episode of the TV series Star Trek: Voyager
 30 Days (Philippine TV series), a 2004 Filipino reality show aired by GMA Network

Publications
30 Days (magazine), an Italian ecclesiastical and political magazine.

Music

Songs
 "Thirty Days" (Chuck Berry song), a song composed and performed by Chuck Berry, covered by several others, sometimes as "Forty Days"
 "Thirty Days", by Clyde McPhatter, composed by Winfield Scott 1956
 "Thirty Days", by David Porter (musician), composed by David Porter and Bonnie Williams, Stax 1970
 "30 Days" (The Saturdays song), a 2012 single by The Saturdays
 "30 Days", a song by Run-D.M.C. from Run-D.M.C.

See also
 "Thirty Days Hath September", a mnemonic rhyme
 Thirty Days' War, the Greco-Turkish War of 1897